Arrah Department is a department of Moronou Region in Lacs District, Ivory Coast. In 2017, Its seat is in the settlement of Arrah. The sub-prefectures of the department are Arrah, Kotobi, and Krégbé.

History
Arrah Department was created in 2009 as a second-level division via a split-off from Bongouanou Department. At its creation, it was part of N'Zi-Comoé Region.

In 2011, districts were introduced as new first-level subdivisions of Ivory Coast. At the same time, regions were reorganised and became second-level subdivisions and all departments were converted into third-level subdivisions. At this time, Arrah Department became part of N'Zi Region in Lacs District. In 2012, it was joined with two other departments to form the new Moronou Region.

Notes

Departments of Moronou Region
States and territories established in 2009
2009 establishments in Ivory Coast